Lake Sumner, known as Hoka Kura in Māori, is a lake situated 100 km northwest of Christchurch in the Canterbury region of New Zealand. The lake is located in the Lake Sumner Forest Park; the Hurunui River and several other lakes (Loch Katrine, Lake Sheppard, Lake Taylor and Lake Mason) also lie within the park.

The Lake Sumner region is a popular area for hunting, tramping, trout fishing, whitewater kayaking, and mountainbiking. Several Department of Conservation tramping huts in the region make it a common destination for overnight trips; however, the area's comparatively remote location and difficult vehicle access mean it is seldom crowded.

Hoka Kura formed approximately 18,000 years ago, covering 1,080 ha and 134 m deep, is a cold oligotrophic lake in inland North Canterbury. It fills a trough, 9.7 km long by 2.4 km wide, within the glacially-carved Hurunui River Valley. The upper Hurunui North Branch River enters the lake via a shingle delta at the north western end and drains through a narrow, natural channel at the south eastern end of the lake.

References

External links

Lake Sumner Forest Park, Department of Conservation
A directory of wetlands in New Zealand, Department of Conservation
Statutory acknowledgement for Hoka Kura (Lake Sumner), Ngāi Tahu Claims Settlement Act 1998

Hoka Kura